Operation Mineral was a military operation launched by the Rhodesian Security Forces against communist guerrillas in Mozambique. The operation resulted in an ambush, which took place along a road close to Inchope in Manica Province, by the SAS on 9 June 1979. During the raid 30 guerrillas were killed by the special forces, who were also able to capture guerrilla intelligence documents and weapons as well once the ambush was finished. 2 Rhodesian soldiers, Private Rodrick Masendeke and Lance Corporal Cletos Takundwa were killed during the ambush.

References

Bibliography

1979 in Rhodesia
Mineral